Dane Searls (22 February 1988 – 25 November 2011) was an Australian BMX rider. He created Giants of Dirt . He died 25 November 2011 after an unsuccessful attempt to jump into a swimming pool from a balcony in Queensland, Australia landing on his head and back, at a party for him jumping the 60 ft dirt ramp. He suffered traumatic head and back injuries, Searls died at Gold Coast Hospital in Southport, Queensland, Australia.

References 

1988 births
2011 deaths
Australian male cyclists
BMX riders
Accidental deaths in Queensland
Accidental deaths from falls